Thomas Joseph McHale (May 7, 1902 – November 12, 1994) was an American novelist. He was the writer of Dooley's Delusion, a novel published in 1972, a story about the "Great West" (Sioux City) set in the 1880s and 1890s.

McHale's papers are kept in the special collections of the library of the University of Iowa.

Works

 McHale, Tom. Dooley's Delusion. 1972. Droke House-Hallux, Anderson, S.C.

References 

20th-century American novelists
American male novelists
1902 births
1994 deaths
20th-century American male writers